The Bailey V5 is a British aircraft engine, designed and produced by Bailey Aviation of Royston, Hertfordshire for use in powered paragliders, in particular the Bailey V5 paramotor.

Design and development
The engine is a single-cylinder four-stroke,  displacement, air and oil-cooled, gasoline engine design, with a poly V belt reduction drive with reduction ratio of 3.2:1. It employs capacitor discharge ignition and produces  at 8200 rpm.

Variants
V5
Base model with manual recoil start, that weighs .
V5E
Model with electric start, that weighs .

Applications
Airsport Song
Bailey V5 paramotor

Specifications (V5)

See also

References

External links

Bailey aircraft engines
Air-cooled aircraft piston engines
2010s aircraft piston engines